The Jerwood Foundation's sculpture collection was a collection of 20th and 21st century sculptures. They were displayed at Ragley Hall in Warwickshire, England. Most of the collection was sold in 2012 at Sotheby's and can no longer be seen at Ragley Hall.

From its beginning in 1999, Jerwood Sculpture displayed large sculptures in natural environments. It was established by the Jerwood Foundation, a major UK funder of arts, education and science.

Alongside works by artists of international reputation such as Dame Elisabeth Frink R.A., Lynn Chadwick R.A., Kenneth Armitage R.A., Michael Ayrton and Antony Gormley R.A., Peter Randall-Page, the Jerwood Sculpture collection included works by emerging artists who had won the Jerwood Sculpture Prize.

References

Sculpture gardens, trails and parks in the United Kingdom
Tourist attractions in Warwickshire
Culture in Warwickshire
Art museums and galleries in Warwickshire